Thesprotia fuscipennis, the grass mantis, is a species of mantis found in Brazil.

References

Fuscipennis
Insects of Brazil
Insects described in 1894